The Durban Cruise Terminal is a new cruise ship terminal constructed in the South African city of Durban.

Work on the terminal began in November 2019. The terminal was expected to be completed in 2020, however, due to the COVID-19 restrictions in South Africa, was only completed in 2021. MSC Orchestra was the first cruise ship to sail from the new terminal.

Business structure 
After two unsuccessful bids, Kwa Zulu Cruise Terminals (KCT) – a joint venture between MSC Cruises SA and Africa Armada Consortium – won the bid in May 2017.

The winning bidders have a 25-year concession on the site.

MSC Opera (Lirica Class) will homeport in Cape Town and MSC Musica (Musica Class) in Durban. This will mark the first time that two different classes of MSC Cruises’ ships will be deployed in South Africa simultaneously.

The construction project 
The project will cost an estimated R200 million and the building will measure 4,500sqm.

The terminal will include:
 A customs office
Parking spaces for 200 vehicles including up to 12 buses
A retail area
Multipurpose training, conferencing and events facilities 
Separate screening and temporary holding areas 
 A Police Station
 Various government offices

During the COVID-19 pandemic 
In February 2021, due to lockdown rules imposed during the Coronavirus pandemic, MSC cancelled its South African sailing season. Passengers with tickets booked were offered vouchers for the next sailing season. The ships were scheduled to set sail again in November 2021 at the earliest.

References

Cruise Terminal, Durban